The Rivière du Nord is a river that flows into the Caraquet Bay west of Caraquet, New Brunswick, Canada.

See also
List of rivers of New Brunswick

Rivers of New Brunswick